Long service leave is type of leave unique to Australia and New Zealand, typically awarded to a staff member after completing a considerable tenure with a single company. However, within a limited number of industries, or within the public sector it is possible to transfer long service leave entitlements from one employer to another.

Industry-specific portable long-service leave 

Industry-specific portable long-service leave allows workers to transfer their accrued long service leave entitlements from employer to employer within an industry. 
Portable Long Service Leave is legislated and available for workers in certain industries including: 
 The Australian Building and Construction Industry
 The Australian Coal Mining Industry
 The Australian Stevedoring Industry
 The Australian Contract Cleaning Industry
The leave is typically funded by a central scheme that accepts payment from current employers, and pays the leave once enough service is accrued. Interest in maintaining and promoting the schemes is largely driven by Unions.

External links 
Construction Industry Long Service Leave schemes in Australia: 
 Victoria – CoINVEST
 South Australia – Portable Long Service Leave
 Queensland – QLeave
 Western Australia – Western Australian Construction Industry Long Service Leave Payments Board
 New South Wales – New South Wales Building and Construction Industry LSL Payments Corporation (LSPC)
 Tasmania – TasBuild 
 Australian Capital Territory – Construction Industry Long Service Leave Board (A.C.T. LSLB)
 Northern Territory – NT Build

Australian labour law
Labour relations in New Zealand
Leave of absence